Didymogonyx is a genus of South American bamboo in the grass family.

Species
 Didymogonyx geminatum (McClure) C.D.Tyrrell, L.G.Clark & Londoño - Colombia, Venezuela
 Didymogonyx longispiculatum (Londoño & L.G.Clark) C.D.Tyrrell, L.G.Clark & Londoño - Colombia

References

Bambusoideae genera
Bambusoideae